Eberhard Isbrand Ides or Evert Ysbrants (Ysbrandszoon) Ides (1657–1708) was a Danish merchant, traveller and diplomat.

Biography
Eberhard Isbrand Ides was from Holstein-Glückstadt. 
By 1687, he settled in the German Quarter  (Nemetskaya sloboda) of Moscow.
In 1692 he travelled  as a Russian envoy to the Kangxi Emperor of China.
While there he was to negotiate trade relations between China and Russia. 
He returned to Russia in 1694 and in 1698 he founded an arms and powder factory in the village of Glinkow. 
In 1700 he became a commissioner of the Admiralty in Arkhangelsk  and in 1704  administrator of export tariffs for Arkhangelsk. 

Ides was one of the first early Europeans to describe the Gobi Desert. In 1698, Dreijahrige Reise Nach China, a German language description of the trip was first published with descriptions of Siberia and Northern China. His account appeared in French translation, along with a work by Dutch author Cornelis de Bruijn (1652-1727) in Voyage de Corneille Le Brun par la Moscovie, en Persia, et aux Indes Orientales (6 parts in 2 volumes), published in Amsterdam in 1718.

References

External links
Works about Evert Ysbrants Ides WorldCat
 

1657 births
1708 deaths
People from Schleswig-Holstein
Danish merchants
Danish explorers
Danish travel writers
Danish emigrants to Russia
17th-century Danish diplomats